William Sawney Bisat, FRS (1886-1973) was a civil engineer in the north of England whose principal recreation was geological research. He is remembered for his work on goniatites which contributed to the refinement of the stratigraphy of the Carboniferous period, not least in northern England.

Bisat was born in Doncaster, West Riding of Yorkshire on 19 October 1886 to Charles Edward and Margaret Bisat.  He was elected as a fellow of the Royal Society in 1947. Amongst positions he held were president of Hull Geological Society (1927–28), of Leeds Geological Association (1934–35) and of the Yorkshire Naturalists' Union (1935). He was elected president of the Yorkshire Geological Society for the period 1938-40 and later won the 1961 Sorby Medal from that society. He was presented with the Lyell Medal by the Geological Society in 1942.

Bisat died on 14 May 1973 at Collingham near Leeds. One genus (Bisatoceras - now a sub-family) and several species of goniatite have been named in his honour including  Gigantoproductus bisati, Cravenoceratoides bisati, Goniatites bisati and Chaenocarciola bisati.

Selected publications
 
 
 
 
 
 
 
  (presidential address delivered in November 1939)

References

1886 births
1973 deaths
People from Doncaster
20th-century British geologists
Lyell Medal winners
Fellows of the Royal Society
Engineers from Yorkshire
Members of the Yorkshire Naturalists' Union